The ancient Welsh cantref of Llŷn in north-west Wales was part of the kingdom of Gwynedd for much of its history until it was included in the new county of Caernarfonshire, together with Arfon and Arllechwedd under the terms of the Statute of Rhuddlan in 1284.

Trahain Goch ap Madoc, died 1325, was described as "of Llŷn".

References 

Llyn
Commotes of Gwynedd
13th century in Wales